Super Colossal Smash Hits of the 90's: The Best of The Mavericks is the first greatest hits collection by the American country music band The Mavericks. The album was originally released on November 9, 1999, by Mercury Nashville. It was re-released on January 25, 2000, with three bonus tracks. "Here Comes My Baby" and "Things I Cannot Change" were released as singles.

In the UK, the album was simply titled The Best of The Mavericks, though it retained the same cover as the US version. It reached number 40 on the UK Albums Chart and was certified Gold by the BPI for sales in excess of 100,000 copies.

Track listing
"Things I Cannot Change" (Dennis Britt, Jaime Hanna, Alan Miller) – 3:41
"Pizziricco" (Kostas, Raul Malo) – 4:04
"Here Comes My Baby" (Cat Stevens) – 3:13
"Think of Me (When You're Lonely)" (Estella Olson, Don Rich) – 2:22
"Dance the Night Away" (Malo) – 4:22
"All You Ever Do Is Bring Me Down" with Flaco Jiménez (Al Anderson, Malo) – 4:21
"Here Comes the Rain" (Kostas, Malo) – 3:47
"I Should Have Been True" (Stan Lynch, Malo) – 5:12
"There Goes My Heart" (Kostas, Malo) – 3:16
"What a Crying Shame" (Kostas, Malo) – 3:51
"This Broken Heart" (Malo) – 3:49
"From Hell to Paradise" (Malo) – 4:53

Re-release
"Things I Cannot Change" (Dennis Britt, Jaime Hanna, Alan Miller) – 3:41
"A World Without Love" (John Lennon, Paul McCartney) – 3:44A
"Are You Lonesome Tonight?" (Lou Handman, Roy Turk) – 3:02A
"Think of Me (When You're Lonely)" (Estella Olson, Don Rich) – 2:22
"Here Comes My Baby" (Cat Stevens) – 3:13
"Pizziricco" (Kostas, Raul Malo) – 4:04
"I've Got This Feeling" (Hanna, Malo) – 3:45A
"Dance the Night Away" (Malo) – 4:22
"All You Ever Do Is Bring Me Down" with Flaco Jiménez (Al Anderson, Malo) – 4:21
"Here Comes the Rain" (Kostas, Malo) – 3:47
"I Should Have Been True" (Stan Lynch, Malo) – 5:12
"There Goes My Heart" (Kostas, Malo) – 3:16
"What a Crying Shame" (Kostas, Malo) – 3:51
"This Broken Heart" (Malo) – 3:49
"From Hell to Paradise" (Malo) – 4:53

ABonus track.

Personnel on bonus tracks

The Mavericks
Paul Deakin- drums
Nick Kane- electric guitar
Raul Malo- lead vocals, acoustic guitar, electric guitar
Robert Reynolds- bass guitar, background vocals

Additional musicians
Dennis Burnside- Hammond organ, conductor, string arrangements 
Glen Caruba- percussion
Jeff Coffin- baritone saxophone
Chris Dunn- trombone
Richard Foust- trombone
Matt Glassmeyer- tenor saxophone
Barry Green- trombone
Jaime Hanna- acoustic guitar, handclapping, background vocals 
Eric Holt- piano
Scotty Huff- horn arrangements, trumpet, background vocals
Matt Nygren- trumpet
Denis Solee- alto saxophone
Robby Turner- pedal steel guitar

Chart performance

References

1999 greatest hits albums
The Mavericks albums
Albums produced by Don Cook
Albums produced by Richard Bennett (guitarist)
Mercury Records compilation albums